Rafaël Pividal (born 1934 near Buenos Aires – 2 October 2006) was a French writer and philosopher.

Biography 
Rafaël Pividal was the son of a French mother, a classical dancer, and an Argentinean father, a lawyer. Rafael's maternal grandmother was a well-known actress, Germaine Dermoz (1888–1966).

At the death of his father in 1944, Rafael and his mother found themselves in a great poverty. From the age of 14, he must give private lessons to earn a little money.

He attended secondary school in Buenos Aires and passed a French baccalaureate (1952); He then went to France to study philosophy. A student at the Sorbonne, he was part of a group which included Gabriel Cohn-Bendit, Lucien Sebag and Pierre Clastres. He was admitted at the agrégation of philosophy in 1959.

From 1964, he taught sociology of art at the Sorbonne. He supported his doctoral thesis (sociology) in 1995 and was thereafter habilited to direct thesis.

In parallel to his teaching, Rafaël Pividal was successively a member of the editorial boards of the Exit and Roman magazines and wrote numerous books.

Works 
Doctoral thesis
1995:De la logique narrative, ou du sens et de la fonction de la fiction, Université Paris 5, under the direction of André Akoun

Fiction and essais
1963: Une paix bien intéressante, Éditions du Seuil
1969: Tentative de visite à une base étrangère, Seuil
1970: Plus de quartier pour Paris, Seuil
1972: Le Capitaine Nemo et la science, Éditions Grasset
1974: Émily et une nuit, Seuil
1976: La Maison de l’écriture, Seuil
1977: Pays sages, Rupture
1978: Le Mensonge - Chronique des années de crise, Ed. Encres, 
1978: La Tête de Louis XVI, Rupture
1978: Un professeur d’américain, 
1989: Le Pré-joli, Balland.
1980: Le Faux-prêtre, 
1981: La Découverte de l’Amérique, Grasset
1985: La Montagne fêlée, Grasset
1986: Grotius, Grasset, (Prix Sainte-Beuve).
1989: Hugo, l’enterré vivant, Presses de la Renaissance
1989: Le Petit Marcel, Grasset
1991: Le Goût de la catastrophe, Presses de la Renaissance
1992: Les Aventures ordinaires de Jacques Lamare, Quai Voltaire
1993: 1994, Robert Laffont

Filmography 
 1992 - Hector Guimard, un architecte et ses folies. by Pascal Kané: himself.

References

External links 
 Hommage à Raphaël Pividal on Carré d'art magazine
 Raphaël Pividal on Encyclopedia Universalis
 Raphaël Pividal on Babelio
 Obituary

20th-century French writers
20th-century French philosophers
French male short story writers
French short story writers
Prix Goncourt de la nouvelle recipients
Prix Sainte-Beuve winners
People from Buenos Aires
1934 births
2006 deaths
20th-century French male writers
French male non-fiction writers